Rotch & Tilden was an American architectural firm active in Boston, Massachusetts from 1880 through 1895.

The firm was organized by partners Arthur Rotch and George Thomas Tilden. Both had studied at the Massachusetts Institute of Technology and at École des Beaux-Arts in Paris. Both had worked at the architectural firm of "Ware and Brunt". 

They were called "society architects” because of their families and their clientele. The firm was perhaps best known for lavish summer houses in Bar Harbour, Maine and for townhouses lining Commonwealth Avenue in the Back Bay area of Boston.

According to architectural historian Harry Katz, "Rotch and Tilden developed an 'increasingly sophisticated blending of Georgian and Federal forms.” Two private residences in Montreal display an exhibit an eclectic blend of Jacobean and Richardsonian Romanesque styles. 

For fifteen years, until Rotch's death in 1894, theirs was one of the most active architectural offices in New England. 

Tilden continued to work until he retired in 1914. Notable graduates of the firm include Ralph Adams Cram and Harold Van Buren Magonigle.

Selected works

 Saint Saviour's Episcopal Church and Rectory, Bar Harbor, Maine, 1877
 The Tides, Bar Harbor, Maine, 1887
 Bennett Building, Billerica Public Library, Billerica, Massachusetts, 1881
 Belvoir Terrace, 1884 - for Morris Ketchum Jesup, who served on the board of directors of the J.S. Morgan Bank.
 Blue Hill Meteorological Observatory, Milton, Massachusetts, 1885
 Church of the Holy Spirit, Mattapan, Boston, 1886
 Farnsworth Art Museum, Wellesley College, Wellesley, Massachusetts, 1887-1889 (razed 1958) 
 Cambridge Manual Training School, Cambridge, Massachusetts, 1889
 Frelinghuysen Arboretum, Morristown, New Jersey, 1891
 Ventfort Hall, Lenox, Massachusetts, 1891-1893 - for Sarah Morgan, sister of J. P. Morgan; the house was used as the Orphanage in the movie “The Cider House Rules.”
 Old Public Library, now the Exeter Historical Society, Exeter, New Hampshire, 1894
 Sea Urchins, mansion for Burton Harrison and now part of College of the Atlantic, Bar Harbor, Maine
 Peavey Memorial Library, Eastport, Maine, 1893

References

External links
 Selection of works with photos

Architecture firms based in Massachusetts
Design companies established in 1880
1880 establishments in Massachusetts
Design companies disestablished in 1895
1895 disestablishments in Massachusetts
American companies disestablished in 1895
American companies established in 1880